A bracelet is an article worn around the wrist.

Bracelet may also refer to:
 Handcuffs, for which 'bracelets' is slang
 Bracelet (combinatorics), a cyclical sequence of symbols used in combinatorial mathematics
 World Series of Poker bracelet, an award won at the World Series of Poker
 The Bracelet (novel), a 1930 novel by Robert Hichens
 Bracelets (film), a 1931 British film
 Bracelet (horse), an Irish Thoroughbred racehorse
 The Bracelet (film), a 1918 German silent crime film
 The Bracelet (Curb Your Enthusiasm), an episode of Curb Your Enthusiasm